Brooke Gysen (born 19 September 1977) is an Australian gymnast. She competed in six events at the 1992 Summer Olympics.

References

External links
 

1977 births
Living people
Australian female artistic gymnasts
Olympic gymnasts of Australia
Gymnasts at the 1992 Summer Olympics
Place of birth missing (living people)